Radio Upper West is a public radio station in Wa, the capital town of the Upper West Region of Ghana. The station is owned and run by the state broadcaster - the Ghana Broadcasting Corporation.

References

Radio stations in Ghana
Mass media in Wa, Ghana